Edward John Bassett (1 January 1889 – 25 November 1970) was an English association football winger.

Career 

Born and raised in London, Bassett played for a variety of local clubs in his teenage years, including Deptford Invicta, Croydon Common, Metrogas and Charlton Albion. He played for Dartford in the Kent League in 1909, and eventually reached the Southern League with Millwall in 1911. After a brief return to Dartford, Bassett joined Notts County of the Football League Second Division. In his first season at Meadow Lane, County won the league, achieving promotion to the First Division, the highest league in English football. County achieved a sixteenth-placed finish the following season, before league football was suspended due to the First World War. During this time he played as a wartime guest player for London clubs Fulham and Tottenham Hotspur.

On the resumption of peacetime football, Bassett joined Watford, from Hertfordshire. He helped them to a 2nd-placed finish on goal average in 1919–20, and the following year played in their inaugural Football League campaign. He was sold to rivals Luton Town for £200 in 1921, and was reported to the league for demanding a percentage of the fee. After a third and final spell at Dartford in 1922, Bassett moved to the city of Cork, playing in the League of Ireland for Cork before finishing his career in London with Finchley.

References 

1889 births
1970 deaths
English footballers
Footballers from Deptford
Association football wingers
Dartford F.C. players
Millwall F.C. players
Notts County F.C. players
Watford F.C. players
Luton Town F.C. players
Cork F.C. players
Finchley F.C. players
English Football League players
Southern Football League players
League of Ireland players
Fulham F.C. wartime guest players
Tottenham Hotspur F.C. wartime guest players
Metrogas F.C. players